Werauhia werckleana is a species of bromeliad in the genus Werauhia. This species is native to Mexico, Guatemala, El Salvador, Honduras, Nicaragua, Costa Rica, and Panama.

References

Catalog of Life retrieved 12 January 2018

werckleana
Flora of Costa Rica
Flora of Mexico